Heading for Heaven is a 1947 American comedy film starring Stuart Erwin and Glenda Farrell. The film was directed by Lewis D. Collins and is based on the 1929 play For the Sake of the Family by Charles Webb and Daniel Brown. Made by Pathe Industries for release by the Producers Releasing Corporation. The film was later picked up for distribution by Eagle-Lion Films after PRC's demise. It was one of several films of the time depicting fraudulent spiritualism such as Nightmare Alley (1947), The Spiritualist (1948) and London Belongs to Me (1948).

Plot
Henry Elkins (Stu Erwin) has been left a large parcel of land by his father and grandfather in what is now the eastern part of the city of Elkinsville. Having been told never to sell the property by his ancestors, Henry has refused several lucrative offers wanting to purchase the land for a cemetery, incinerator or the city dump in favour of wishing to develop a housing estate.

Henry lives with his wife Nora Elkins (Glenda Farrell) who passionately believes in a fraudulent Swami who conducts seances, a snappy housekeeper (Irene Ryan), a lazy brother in law (George O'Hanlon), a daughter and a cat who all give him problems, Henry dreams the land will someday bring him both great fortune and self-respect.

Henry's life changes when he overhears information about one of his Doctor's patients who is terminally ill that he thinks is his own diagnosis when he goes for a physical for an insurance policy.  He agrees to sell his land to an airline wishing to build an airport giving his wife and family the money as a legacy but several people in Elkinsville attempt to give Henry fraudulent information to lower his price or intend to acquire it for themselves.  One of them uses the swami to convince Henry to sell the land to them who will then sell it to the airlines for a profit for themselves.

Surrounded by problems Henry goes to a peaceful lake to meditate.  He falls asleep where nightmares wake him up causing him to fall in the water.  As he is drying his clothes they also fall in the water and float away leading policemen who find his clothes containing a note to his wife that Henry has taken his own life.  Henry's return to his home is delayed when he has to steal the clothes of a scarecrow leading him to a pair of hoboes who befriend him and get him drunk.  He returns in time to find a real representative from the airline making Henry a direct substantial offer for his property that will include a housing estate, but first Henry decides to teach the swindlers and his gullible family a lesson by crashing a seance they have planned.

Cast
Stuart Erwin as Henry Elkins
Glenda Farrell as Nora Elkins
Russ Vincent as Swami
Irene Ryan as Molly the Maid
Milburn Stone as Elwood Harding
George O'Hanlon as Alvin Ponacress
Janis Wilson as Janie Elkins
Ralph Hodges as Danny Wingate
Dick Elliott as Roger Wingate
Charles Williams as Eddie Williams
Selmer Jackson as Doctor

Home media
Heading for Heaven was released on DVD on February 22, 2005.

References

External links

1947 films
1940s English-language films
American black-and-white films
1947 drama films
Producers Releasing Corporation films
American films based on plays
Films directed by Lewis D. Collins
Eagle-Lion Films films
American drama films
1940s American films